Government Higher Secondary School Palayajayankondam is situated in Tamil Nadu, in Karur district, Krishnarayapuram taluk. It enrolled 1,080 students and 35 teachers during the 2015–16 academic year.

References

High schools and secondary schools in Tamil Nadu
Karur district